Bangalaia molitor is a species of beetle in the family Cerambycidae. It was described by Karl Jordan in 1903. It is known from Tanzania and Malawi.

References

Prosopocerini
Beetles described in 1903